Track 29 is a 1988 psychological drama film directed by Nicolas Roeg and starring Theresa Russell, Gary Oldman, Colleen Camp, Sandra Bernhard, Seymour Cassel, and Christopher Lloyd. It was produced by George Harrison's HandMade Films with Rick McCallum. The film was nominated for and won a few awards at regional film festivals.  The writer, Dennis Potter, adapted his earlier television play, Schmoedipus (1974), changing the setting from London to the United States.  It was filmed in Wilmington and Wrightsville Beach, North Carolina

Plot
In rural Wilmington, North Carolina, Linda Henry lives a solitary and unfulfilled life with her husband, Henry Henry, a doctor who spends the majority of his free time tinkering with model trains. At his clinic, Henry carries on an affair with a nurse, Ms. Stein, unbeknownst to Linda. While dining at a cafe with her friend Arlanda, Linda encounters Martin, a British hitchhiker who was born in North Carolina but raised in England; he has arrived in the United States in search of his birthmother.

Later that night, Linda is frightened to see Martin standing outside her home. He confronts her the following day while she swims in her swimming pool, and suggests he is the biological son she gave up for adoption while a teenager. She initially disbelieves him, but he provides intimate details about the woman who raised him, who was in fact the British housekeeper of Linda's family. Martin says that she accompanied him back to England with him shortly after his birth. Martin begins to exhibit increasingly childlike behavior toward Linda, expressing sadness over his lack of having his biological mother in his life. Linda responds in a maternal manner.

Linda and Martin go out for a dinner together at a local bar, but the waiter observes Linda alone at the table, talking to herself and crying. Meanwhile, Linda believes herself to be engaging with Martin, who is seemingly a figment of her imagination. She recounts to Martin his conception, which occurred during a rape Linda suffered while attending a local carnival. The two return home as Linda continues to get progressively drunk, and Martin's behavior vacillates between being increasingly childlike and Oedipal in nature. Meanwhile, Henry and Nurse Stein attend a local convention for model train enthusiasts. Afterward, Henry tells Nurse Stein he wants her to join him when he accepts a new job out of state.

At home, Linda has a vision of a semi-truck crashing through her bedroom while Martin destroys Henry's elaborate model train set. He subsequently sings and plays Linda a song on the piano that moves Linda to tears. After Martin leaves, Linda awakens in the living room in the middle of the night, and hysterically calls Arlanda for help. Linda tells Arlanda she let the "boy they met in the diner" into her home, but Arlanda seems clueless as to what she is referring to. Linda proceeds to recount the story of her rape, pregnancy, and subsequent placing of her newborn for adoption.

Henry returns to find Arlanda and Linda at the house. When Arlanda goes to get Linda something to drink, Henry begins to slap Linda, but is stopped when an enraged Arlanda re-enters the room. Linda calmly escorts Arlanda out of the house, assuring her everything is fine. Linda, in her dissociated state, envisions a naked Martin stabbing Henry to death upstairs amongst his train set. The next morning, Linda fashions herself in an elegant dress and departs the house, hearing the voice of Henry repeatedly calling her name. She ignores it, and drives away. Inside the house, a pool of blood—ostensibly that of the murdered Henry—has soaked through the upstairs floor, and drips from the living room ceiling.

Cast
 Theresa Russell as Linda Henry
 Gary Oldman as Martin
 Christopher Lloyd as Henry Henry
 Colleen Camp as Arlanda
 Sandra Bernhard as Nurse Stein
 Seymour Cassel as Dr. Bernard Fairmont

Critical reception
Janet Maslin of The New York Times thought the film missed the mark:

However, Roger Ebert of the Chicago Sun-Times rated it 3 stars out of his 4 star rating system and found the film well done but painful:

References

External links 
 
 
 

1988 films
1988 drama films
1980s English-language films
American psychological drama films
British psychological drama films
Films about adoption
Films about imaginary friends
Films about rape
Films directed by Nicolas Roeg
Films produced by Rick McCallum
Films scored by Stanley Myers
Films set in North Carolina
Films shot in North Carolina
Films with screenplays by Dennis Potter
Golan-Globus films
HandMade Films films
Films about mental health
1980s American films
1980s British films